The Utah Blitz is a team of the Women's Football Alliance (WFA) which began play in the 2010 season.  Based in Salt Lake City, Utah, the Blitz plays its home games at Taylorsville High School in Taylorsville.

Season-By-Season

|-
|2010 || 0 || 7 || 0 || 3rd American North Pacific || --
|-
|2011 || 3 || 5 || 0 || 2nd American Northwest || --
|-
|2012*|| 0 || 4 || 0 || 3rd WFA American 14|| --
|-
|2013 || 0 || 7 || 0 || WFA ||
|-
|2014 || 4 || 4 || 0 || 4th WFA American Pacific region/northwest ||
|-
|2015 || 2 || 4 || 0 || 2nd WFA American Mountain West Conference ||
|-
|Totals || 9 || 30 || 0
|colspan="2"|

Season Schedules

2017

2011

Standings

Season schedule

2012

Season schedule

References

External links 
Utah Blitz website
Women's Football Alliance website

2010 establishments in Utah
Women's Football Alliance teams
Sports in Salt Lake City
American football teams in Utah
American football teams established in 2010
Women's sports in Utah